Calonotos craneae is a moth of the subfamily Arctiinae. It was described by Henry Fleming in 1957. It is found in Trinidad.

References

Arctiinae
Moths described in 1957